Husslein is a German surname. Notable people with the surname include:

Kyle Husslein (born 1995), Guamanian-American basketball player
Hermann Husslein (born 1985), German-Thai slalom canoeist

See also
Hussein

German-language surnames